The 1994 Belgian Grand Prix was a Formula One motor race held on 28 August 1994 at the Circuit de Spa-Francorchamps, near the village of Francorchamps, Wallonia. It was the eleventh race of the 1994 Formula One World Championship.

The 44-lap race was won by British driver Damon Hill, driving a Williams-Renault. After Brazilian Rubens Barrichello took the first pole position for the Jordan team, German Michael Schumacher crossed the finish line first in his Benetton-Ford, only to be disqualified due to excessive wear on the wooden skid block underneath his car. Hill was thus awarded the win, his third of the season, with Finn Mika Häkkinen second in a McLaren-Peugeot and Schumacher's Dutch teammate Jos Verstappen third.

Report

Background
Having deputised for a suspended Mika Häkkinen at McLaren at the previous race in Hungary, Philippe Alliot now returned to his old Larrousse team for this race, taking the place of Olivier Beretta. Meanwhile, the cash-strapped Lotus replaced Alessandro Zanardi with local driver Philippe Adams, who brought significant funding to the team.

Following the deaths of Roland Ratzenberger and Ayrton Senna at Imola earlier in the season, a chicane was installed at Eau Rouge to slow the cars.

Qualifying

The Friday qualifying session was held in wet but drying conditions. Towards the end of the session, the Jordan cars were sent out on slick tyres, and Rubens Barrichello duly put his car on provisional pole with teammate Eddie Irvine fourth. More rain fell on Saturday, with most of the drivers lapping several seconds slower than the day before, and only Christian Fittipaldi improving his time. Thus, Barrichello took the first pole position of his career and the first for Jordan. At 22 years and 98 days, Barrichello became the youngest ever F1 polesitter up to that point, beating the record set by Andrea de Cesaris at the 1982 United States Grand Prix West.

Drivers' Championship leader Michael Schumacher was second in his Benetton, with Damon Hill third in his Williams. After Irvine came Jean Alesi in the Ferrari, Jos Verstappen in the second Benetton, David Coulthard in the second Williams and the returning Häkkinen, with Heinz-Harald Frentzen in the Sauber and Pierluigi Martini in the Minardi completing the top ten.

Race

In dry conditions, Barrichello led away from Schumacher and a fast-starting Alesi. Schumacher passed Barrichello at Les Combes, and Alesi soon followed, only for his engine to fail on lap 3. With the Jordans struggling to hold on to track position against faster cars, Hill moved into second, ahead of Coulthard and Häkkinen. Gerhard Berger in the remaining Ferrari also retired with engine failure by lap 12. Philippe Adams who made his debut Grand Prix appearance at his home circuit soon spun out into the gravel trap, five laps after Berger retired.

Coulthard overtook teammate Hill during the first round of pit stops, while Barrichello moved back up to second before making his stop. On lap 19, Schumacher spun exiting Fagnes but retained the lead; the following lap, Barrichello spun into retirement at Pouhon and clipped the armco barrier giving his Jordan 194 terminal suspension damage. Martin Brundle moved into fifth in the second McLaren, before he himself had spun off and clipped the armco like Barrichello by lap 25.

When Schumacher and Hill made their second pit stops on lap 28, Coulthard led a lap for the first time in his F1 career. After making his own second stop, he remained ahead of Hill until the Williams team called him in on lap 37 to check his rear wing. He then developed gearbox problems and was passed by Häkkinen, Verstappen and Mark Blundell in the Tyrrell. On lap 40, Coulthard hit the back of Blundell's car going through La Source; both were able to continue, with Coulthard apologising to Blundell afterwards. Eddie Irvine was the final retirement with the result of an alternator failure with only 3 laps to go and was classified 14th, leaving 13 runners left in the race up to the finish.

Though Hill set the fastest lap of the race on lap 41, Schumacher crossed the finish line some 13 seconds ahead, with Häkkinen a further 51 seconds back and Verstappen, Coulthard, Blundell and Morbidelli completing the top six.

Post-race

Shortly after the race, excessive wear was found on the wooden skid block on the underside of Schumacher's car. The skid block was a mandatory requirement on all cars, introduced two races before in Germany, to increase ride height and reduce ground effect advantages. Wear on the skid block of up to 1mm was permitted; any greater would make the ride height too low and result in an illegal aerodynamic advantage. The Benetton team claimed that the excessive wear resulted from Schumacher's spin on lap 19, but the stewards rejected the claim because of the wear pattern. Schumacher was thus disqualified and Hill awarded the victory, with Häkkinen second, Verstappen third, Coulthard fourth, Blundell fifth and Gianni Morbidelli sixth in the Footwork.

Schumacher's lead over Hill in the Drivers' Championship was reduced to 21 points with five races remaining.

Classification

Qualifying

Race

Championship standings after the race

Drivers' Championship standings

Constructors' Championship standings

References

Belgian Grand Prix
Belgian Grand Prix
Grand Prix
Belgian Grand Prix